is a former JR West Kabe Line station located in Iimuro, Asa-machi, Asakita-ku, Hiroshima, Hiroshima Prefecture, Japan. The station is located near Jinshin Bridge, and was going to be named after the bridge. However, when it came time to name the station, the residents in the area wanted it named Kegi, after the area in which it was located. It closed on December 1, 2003, when operation of the line was discontinued/suspended between Kabe Station and Sandankyō Station.

History
1956-12-20: Kegi Station opens
1971-05-20: After the merging of Asa-machi, Asa District into the city of Hiroshima, the area around the station is renamed Iimuro, Kabe-chō, Asa-machi, Hiroshima
1973: Kegi Station becomes a Hiroshima City station
1980-04-01: After Hiroshima becomes a designated city, the area around the station is renamed Iimuro, Asa-machi, Asakita-ku, Hiroshima
1987-04-01: Japanese National Railways is privatized, and Kegi Station becomes a JR West station
2003-12-01: Kegi Station closes along with the rest of the non-electrified section of the Kabe Line

Station building
Kegi Station is located just northwest of and below an overpass for the Hiroshima Expressway. It features one side platform capable of handling one line, and featuring an enclosed waiting area.  The station is unmanned, and the station building is covered, but only enclosed on three sides.

Environs
The Ōta River is approximately 300 meters southwest of Kegi Station. Most of Asa-machi is located on the opposite shore of the Ōta River. The Kegi Civic Hall is located about 80 km northwest of the station.

Highway access
 Hiroshima Prefectural Route 177 (Shimosa Higashi Route)
 Hiroshima Prefectural Route 267 (Utsu-Kabe Route)

Connecting lines
This information is historical as all stations on this part of the Kabe Line are currently suspended from regular service.
Kabe Line
Aki-Kameyama Station — Kegi Station — Aki-Imuro Station

References

Kabe Line suspended stations
Stations of West Japan Railway Company in Hiroshima city
Railway stations in Japan opened in 1956
Railway stations closed in 2003